Bad Timing is a 1997 studio album by American musician Jim O'Rourke, and the first to be released by the Drag City label. Although O'Rourke had previously established himself with a prolific output of experimental music beginning in the late 1980s, this album marked the beginning of his series of albums released by Drag City focusing on more traditional instrumentation and song structures.  It is an instrumental album, consisting largely of Jim O'Rourke's acoustic guitar playing (much in the style of John Fahey), sometimes with additional instrumentation.

The album is named after the 1980 film Bad Timing: A Sensual Obsession, directed by Nicolas Roeg. It is one of a trio of O'Rourke albums, along with Eureka and Insignificance, to be named after Roeg films from the 1980s.

Critical reception
MusicHound Rock: The Essential Album Guide wrote that the album's "four long, shape-shifting instrumentals blend O'Rourke's finger-picking with electronic textures and orchestrations for horns and string that abruptly, mischievously change mood." Tiny Mix Tapes wrote that the album "shows O’Rourke taking his John Fahey worship to a majestic extreme."

Track listing

References

1999 albums
Jim O'Rourke (musician) albums
Drag City (record label) albums